Germain Cabrera (born January 15, 1986) is an Aruban football player. He has played for Aruba national team.

National team statistics

References

1986 births
Living people
Aruban footballers
Association football midfielders
SV Britannia players
Aruba international footballers